Scott McGehee (born April 20, 1962) is an American filmmaker.  He is a Columbia University graduate and did graduate work in the Rhetoric department at UC Berkeley. He was born in California, and currently resides in New York City.  McGehee is openly gay.

He is half of a long-standing writing-directing partnership with filmmaker David Siegel. Neither attended film school.

Filmography

Feature films

Executive producer
 The Business of Strangers (2001)

References

External links

Indiewire interview

Living people
American male screenwriters
People from Orange County, California
Columbia College (New York) alumni
University of California, Berkeley alumni
Film directors from California
1962 births
LGBT film directors
LGBT people from California
American gay writers
American gay artists
American LGBT screenwriters
Screenwriters from California
Film producers from California
Film directors from New York City
Film producers from New York (state)
Screenwriters from New York (state)
21st-century American screenwriters
20th-century American screenwriters